By the Light of the Northern Star is the fifth full-length album by the Faroese folk metal band Týr. It was released on 29 May 2009 through Napalm Records. The cover artwork is by Gyula Havancsák.

Track listing

Personnel
 Heri Joensen – vocals, guitars, production
 Terji Skibenæs – guitars
 Gunnar Thomsen – bass
 Kári Streymoy – drums, production
 Jacob Hansen – mixing
 Mika Jussila – mastering
 Gyula Havancsák – artwork

References

2009 albums
Týr (band) albums
Napalm Records albums